Ahmed Mohamed Hussain Kandil (1923 or 1924 – 10 May 1950) was an Egyptian swimmer. He competed in the men's 200 metre breaststroke and men's 4 × 200 metre freestyle relay events at the 1948 Summer Olympics held in London, United Kingdom. He was killed in a plane crash on 11 May 1950 while serving with the Egyptian Air Force when his Spitfire collided in mid-air with another Spitfire over Port Said.

References

External links
 

1920s births
1950 deaths
Egyptian male swimmers
Male breaststroke swimmers
Egyptian male freestyle swimmers
Olympic swimmers of Egypt
Swimmers at the 1948 Summer Olympics
Place of birth missing
People from Tanta
Egyptian Air Force personnel
Mid-air collisions 
Mid-air collisions involving military aircraft
Victims of aviation accidents or incidents in Egypt
Victims of aviation accidents or incidents in 1950
Military aviators
20th-century Egyptian people